Avery: An Anthology of New Fiction was a biannual literary magazine based in New York City, United States. Founded in 2006 by Stephanie Fiorelli, Adam Koehler, and Andrew Palmer, the magazine published previously unpublished fiction by previously unpublished, emerging, and established authors. Editor Emma Straub replaced Andrew Palmer and Graphic Designer Mike Fusco run Avery'''s art department. In addition to publishing fiction, the magazine was dedicated to showcasing emerging artists and using emerging artists' artwork to complement the magazine's fiction.

As of December 11, 2013 Duotrope lists Avery'' as "permanently closed to submissions." It was closed in September 2012.

See also
List of literary magazines

References

External links
Avery official site

American anthologies
Biannual magazines published in the United States
Defunct literary magazines published in the United States
Magazines established in 2006
Magazines disestablished in 2012
Magazines published in New York City